Lucas Emanuel Gómez Benites (born 6 October 1987) is an Argentine footballer who plays for Liga Nacional club Antigua.

Club career
On 30 January 2018, Neftchi Baku announced the signing of Gómez on a one-year contract. On 24 June 2018, Gómez was demoted to the Neftchi's reserve team, along with Mike Campaz, for the remainder of his contract.

References

External links
 

1987 births
Living people
Argentine footballers
Association football forwards
Independiente Rivadavia footballers
Club Almagro players
Brujas FC players
Deportivo Armenio footballers
C.F. Universidad de Costa Rica footballers
F.C. Motagua players
L.D. Alajuelense footballers
C.S. Cartaginés players
Asociación Civil Deportivo Lara players
Liga FPD players
Liga Nacional de Fútbol Profesional de Honduras players
Venezuelan Primera División players
Azerbaijan Premier League players
Bolivian Primera División players
Neftçi PFK players
Juan Aurich footballers
Real Santa Cruz players
Argentine expatriate sportspeople in Azerbaijan
Expatriate footballers in Costa Rica
Expatriate footballers in Honduras
Expatriate footballers in Venezuela
Expatriate footballers in Peru
Expatriate footballers in Bolivia
Sportspeople from Mendoza Province